Sri Lanka is a tropical island situated close to the southern tip of India. The invertebrate fauna is as large as it is common to other regions of the world. There are about 2 million species of arthropods found in the world, and still it is counting. So many new species are discover up to this time also. So it is very complicated and difficult to summarize the exact number of species found within a certain region.

The following list is about Termites recorded in Sri Lanka.

Termite
Phylum: Arthropoda
Class: Insecta
Order: Blattodea
Infra Order: Isoptera

Termites are eusocial insects that are classified at the taxonomic rank of infraorder Isoptera, or as epifamily Termitoidae within the cockroach order Blattodea. Termites were once classified in a separate order from cockroaches, but recent phylogenetic studies indicate that they evolved from close ancestors of cockroaches during the Jurassic or Triassic. It is possible, however, that the first termites emerged during the Permian or even the Carboniferous. Approximately 3,106 species are currently described, with a few hundred more left to be described.

In 1913, Green compiled a concise catalogue for isopterans in Sri Lanka. The first known study on termites was done by Wasmann during British period. Since then, many local and overseas scientists engaged on many studies, some in crop plantations as well. A detailed work on Sri Lankan termites was done by University of Peradeniya in 2012. According to this checklist, which is based on 1893 literature, a total of 64 species of termites in 27 genera and 4 families are recorded from Sri Lanka.

Endemic species are denoted as E.

Family: Hodotermitidae - Harvester termites
Anacanthotermes viarum

Family: Kalotermitidae - Drywood termites
Postelectrotermes militaris 
Neotermes greeni 
Neotermes kemneri 
Kalotermes jepsoni 
Glyptotermes ceylonicus 
Glyptotermes dilatatus 
Glyptotermes minutus 
Bifiditermes pintoi 
Cryptotermes bengalensis 
Cryptotermes ceylonicus 
Cryptotermes cynocephalus 
Cryptotermes domesticus 
Cryptotermes dudleyi 
Cryptotermes perforans - E

Family: Rhinotermitidae - Subterranean termites
Coptotermes ceylonicus 
Coptotermes emersoni 
Coptotermes formosanus 
Coptotermes gaurii 
Coptotermes gestroi 
Heterotermes ceylonicus 
Heterotermes indicola 
Termitogeton umbilicatus - E 
Prorhinotermes flavus

Family: Termitidae - Higher termites
Macrotermes convulsionarius 
Odontotermes assmuthi 
Odontotermes ceylonicus 
Odontotermes escherichi 
Odontotermes feae 
Odontotermes globicola 
Odontotermes horni 
Odontotermes koenigi 
Odontotermes preliminaris 
Odontotermes redemanni 
Odontotermes taprobanes 
Hypotermes obscuriceps 
Hypotermes winifredi 
Microtermes macronotus 
Microtermes obesi 
Eurytermes ceylonicus 
Speculitermes sinhalensis 
Nasutitermes ceylonicus 
Nasutitermes horni 
Nasutitermes lacustris 
Nasutitermes oculatus 
Ceylonitermes escherichi 
Hospitalitermes monoceros 
Trinervitermes biformis 
Trinervitermes rubidus 
Ceylonitermellus hantanae 
Ceylonitermellus kotuae 
Synhamitermes ceylonicus 
Synhamitermes colombensis - E 
Microcerotermes bugnioni 
Microcerotermes cylindriceps 
Microcerotermes greeni 
Microcerotermes heimi 
Microcerotermes minor 
Angulitermes ceylonicus 
Dicuspiditermes hutsoni 
Dicuspiditermes incola 
Dicuspiditermes nemorosus 
Pericapritermes ceylonicus 
Pericapritermes speciosus

Notes
A sign of termite infestation that is very poignant is the appearance of swarmers or alates. 
A termite colony can get overpopulated. A new queen will strike out on her own to begin a new colony. She needs to mate with a male of the species and find a new area in which to start building her nest. Growing wings and flying enables her to do this. So each season, alates emerge from the colonies and take flight. When they do, and what triggers them to come out depend mostly on the weather and the population pressure in the termite colony. High humidity, and warm weather favour these manifestations.

References

L
 
Termites
Sri Lanka